Raoul Henar (born 4 August 1972) is a Dutch former professional footballer who played as a forward for Eerste Divisie and Eredivisie clubs Stormvogels Telstar, SC Veendam, Helmond Sport and FC Volendam between 1997 and 2004.

References

External links
 

1972 births
Living people
Surinamese emigrants to the Netherlands
Sportspeople from Paramaribo
Dutch footballers
Association football forwards
SC Telstar players
SC Veendam players
Helmond Sport players
FC Volendam players
Eredivisie players
Eerste Divisie players